Andrew Appleby (born 11 October 1985) is an English former footballer who played as a striker in the English Football League for Hartlepool United.

Playing career
Appleby came through the ranks of the Hartlepool academy and was a part of the youth team that won the MetroStars U-19s Dallas Cup in 2004.

Appleby made 18 appearances in all competitions for the League One side in the 2004-05 season when the team made the 2005 Football League One play-off final. Appleby scored twice for Hartlepool in games against AFC Bournemouth and MK Dons.

During his time with Hartlepool, Appleby spent time out on loan with Whitby Town and Blyth Spartans.

Following his release from Hartlepool in 2006, Appleby signed for Gateshead. He later played non-league football for Whitby Town, Sunderland RCA, Crook Town, Darlington Railway Athletic and Jarrow Roofing. He would score proficially for Roofing.

References

External links

Andy Appleby's player profile at In The Mad Crowd

1985 births
Living people
Sportspeople from Seaham
English footballers
Association football forwards
Hartlepool United F.C. players
Whitby Town F.C. players
Gateshead F.C. players
Crook Town A.F.C. players
Darlington Railway Athletic F.C. players
Jarrow Roofing Boldon Community Association F.C. players
English Football League players
Footballers from County Durham